Rhododendron hyperythrum (微笑杜鹃, wei xiao du juan) is a Rhododendron species endemic to north-central Taiwan at  altitude. The flowers are unusual in being pure white.

The plant remains compact in size, and flowers profusely, making it a popular subject for small gardens.

References

 Icon. Pl. Formosan. 3: 133–134 1913.

hyperythrum